Tigloidine is a tropane alkaloid that naturally occurs as a minor constituent of a number of solanaceous plants, including Duboisia myoporoides, Physalis peruviana, and Mandragora turcomanica.

It was formerly marketed as an antiparkinsonian drug under the trade name Tropigline.

References 

Tropane alkaloids
Antiparkinsonian agents